Gerce is a village in Kozaklı, Nevşehir, Turkey.  The population is 143 people.

See also
Churches of Göreme, Turkey
Derinkuyu Underground City
Kaymaklı Underground City
Mokissos

Notes

References

External links
 District governor's official website 
 Map of Avanos district
 District municipality's official website 
 Maps of Kozakli 
 Administrative map of Kozaklı district
 Zelve with pictures and information

External links 
  Website of Gerce village

Villages in Kozaklı District